Okwawu United  is a Ghanaian professional football club based in Nkawkaw, Eastern Region. They are competing in the Eastern Region Division Two League. Their home stadium is Nkawkaw Stadium.

History

Like any human institution which does not document its birth and growth at the appropriate time, Okwawu United face divergent viewpoints as to its formation

THE MERGER STORY

One school of thought holds the view that Okwawu United is a merger of two Nkawkaw-based clubs namely; Okwahu stores and Super Obuoma

OUTGROWTH OF YOUNG AFRICANS

The second group share the conviction that Okwawu United is an outgrowth of a then fourth division team called YOUNG AFRICANS.

Young Africans founded in 1973 by a group of football enthusiasts qualified for the regional third division in 1974 and for the Eastern regional second division B in 1976. Nevertheless, in that year the Regional Football Association changed the league system and asked all clubs to play in their respective qualifying groups in the districts. Young Africans then topped the Mpraeso District league to qualify for the regional division in 1976

In 1974, a merger meeting was arranged between the Executives of Okwahu Stores, Super Obuoma and Young Africans at Nkawkaw topway in order to cushion down the financial constraints facing all the clubs in the locality. However, the meeting failed to reach any compromise on name and other modalities, leaving Young Africans to maintain its identity and continue in the district league.

THE RE-CHRISTENING

Faced with serious financial constraints some officials of Young Africans notably Alhaji Yahya (chief butcher)- chairman, T.A. Offei (Team Manager/player), Alhaji Abyssinia and Mrs Ampem-Danquah approached Alhaji M.K. Osei, an Nkawkaw businessman for help. Alhaji Osei therefore, took over the chairmanship of the club and with the approval of the then Eastern Regional sports organizer H.A. Asamoah, Young Africans was renamed KWAHU UNITED on 15 June 1975 with the view of getting help and support of indigenous citizens of the area.

Thus, under a new name, KWAHU UNITED, the club participated in the 1976 Regional second division league and played alongside Okwahu stores while Super Obuoma was then defunct

THE PROMOTION

Kwahu United (as then known) qualified for the national middle league in 1978. In 1979, Mr E.O. Boateng became the chairman of the club and as part of the measures instituted by his administration, moved the team to Accra under coach Jim Amoah. The resignation of some eight players at this crucial stage of the club's growth denied the team the opportunity to qualify for the elite league. Nonetheless, the club now re-christened OKWAWU UNITED qualified for the national first division in 1981.

The year also marked a turning point in the administration of the club, when the management created the BOARD OF DIRECTORS, of prominent Kwahu citizens and businessmen to serve as financiers.

Changes In Administration 
In 1982, Alhaji Mohammed Kwame Osei, described as the PIVOT OF OKWAWU UNITED resigned as vice-chairman while remaining as founder.

In December 1983, Mr Emmanuel Ofori Boateng also resigned as Executive Chairman to be replaced by Mr. G.K. Abankwa as Interim Chairman. In 1984, Mr R.K. Appiah of Kwapaco limited was elected Executive Chairman for a 3-year term in line with dictates of the clubs's constitution.

The club is registered with the Registrar General Department as a limited liability company by guarantee.

Club Logo (Crest) and Its Colors 
The club uses the three traditional colors (Red, White and Yellow) and a symbol of the traditional stool embedded in the crest.

RED: represents our fearsomeness and bravely in fighting to the latter on the pitch.

WHITE: stands for victory in peace by crowing efforts made on the playing field.

YELLOW: defines our wealth as people highly industrious in entrepreneur skills.

SYMBOL: represents the unity and power as a traditional area.

Performance in CAF competitions
CAF Cup Winners' Cup: 2 appearances
1987 - Second Round
2001 - withdrew in First Round

Current squad

Notable Players Produced 

 Anthony (Tony) Yeboah
 Emmanuel Asare
 Annor Walker 
 Thomas Agbevedor
 Seth Osei Wire
 Johnson Eklu
 Ibrahim Meriga
 Opele Aboagye
 C. K. Akonnor
 Amankwa Mireku
 George Tutu
 Fatau Dauda
 Yaw Acheampong
 Boakye Yiadom (Joe Palopa)
 Michael Abu
 Emmanuel Bentil
 Emmanuel Yartey
 Owusu Mensah
 Mohammed Odum
 Baba Yussif
 Ntow Gyan

Past Executive Chairmen 

 Mr Kwadwo Boanteng
 Mr Kwame Appiah
 Mr G.K Abankwa
 Mr Kwabena Danso
 Mr Kwadwo Darko
 Mr Jaskot Ampadu
 Mr Ofosu Bamfo (sikkens)
 Mr Francis Anom
 Nana Agyei Francis (Nafak)
 Mr Bryn Acheampong

Staff

Life Patron 
Daasebre Akuamoah Agyapong II

Current Board Members 

 Samuel Anim Addo – Chairman
 Kingsley Adofo-Addo – Secretary
 Yaw Obeng – Finance Director
 Emmanuel Akoto Bamfo – Marketing and Corporate Director
 Prince Boateng – Operations Director

Technical Team 

 Richard Odame – Head Coach
 Bismark Asiedu – Assistant Coach
 Mustaphafi Sule – Goalkeepers Trainer
 Richard Ayensu – Team Manager
 Abraham Ofori - Physiotherapist
 Samuel Abbosey – Equipment Officer

List of Past Coaches

 Oko Ayi
 Jim Amoah
 Sam Arday
 Emmanuel Kwasi Afrane
 Jones Attuquafio
 Sarfo Castro
 Stephen Abugri
 Ben Besah Zola
 Ibrahim Merigah
 Mohammed Gargo
 Adolf Adu-Botwe
 Maxwell Cobblah
 Francis Oti Akenteng
 Herbert Addo
 Nana Kwaku Agyemang
 Osei Kofi
 Nii Adu Sackey
 Dauda Solomon Luttrote
 Dan Owusu
 Isaac Opele Boateng
 Emmanuel Sasu
 David Taylor
 Matovic
 J. E. Sarpong

References

Football clubs in Ghana
Eastern Region (Ghana)